

Given name

Romeu is a Portuguese masculine given name, a variant of Romeo.

People with this name include:

Romeu Almeida (born 1974), retired Portuguese footballer
Romeu Beltrão (1913-1977), Brazilian physician, educator, historian and paleontologist
Romeu Evangelista (born 1950), retired Brazilian footballer
Romeu Filemón (born 1965), Angolan football manager
Romeu Italo Ripoli (1916-1983), Brazilian agronomist, businessman, politician and sports manager
Romeu Pellicciari (1911-1971), Brazilian footballer
Romeu Pereira dos Santos (born 1985), Brazilian footballer
Romeu Ribeiro (born 1989), Portuguese footballer
Romeu Rocha (born 1986), Portuguese footballer
Romeu Torres (born 1984), Portuguese footballer
Romeu Tuma (1931-2010), Brazilian politician
Romeu Silva (born 1954), retired Portuguese footballer
Romeu Zema (born 1964), Brazilian politician (current governor of Minas Gerais)

Surname

Romeu can be also a Catalan-language surname. People with this surname include:

Antonio María Romeu (1876-1955), Cuban pianist
Armando de Sequeira Romeu, Cuban musician
Claudia Dasca Romeu (born 1994), Spanish swimmer
David Balaguer Romeu (born 1991), Spanish handball player
Emma Romeu, Cuban writer and geographer
Fábio Santos, full name Fábio Santos Romeu (born 1985), Brazilian footballer
Inês Etienne Romeu (1942-2015), Brazilian political prisoner
Jean-Pierre Romeu (born 1948), former French rugby union footballer
José Antonio Roméu (1742?-1792), the sixth Spanish governor of Alta California
Leonora Milà Romeu (born 1942), Spanish pianist and composer
Oriol Romeu (born 1991), Spanish footballer
Xavier Romeu, Puerto Rican counselor and litigator

Other
Romeu (cartoonist), Spanish cartoonist
Arboretum de Font-Romeu, an arboretum in France
Camerata Romeu, an all-female instrumentalist chamber music group of Cuban origin
Font-Romeu-Odeillo-Via, a commune in France

Portuguese masculine given names
Catalan-language surnames